The Bourne Braves are a collegiate summer baseball team based in Bourne, Massachusetts. The team is a member of the Cape Cod Baseball League (CCBL) and plays in the league's West Division. The Braves play their home games at Doran Park on the campus of Upper Cape Cod Regional Technical School in Bourne. The Braves are owned and operated by the non-profit Bourne Athletic Association.

Bourne won its second CCBL championship of the modern era in 2022 by defeating the Brewster Whitecaps two games to none to win the best of three championship series. The Braves and the Whitecaps joined the CCBL in 1988 as expansion teams, bringing the number of teams in the league to its current ten.

History

Pre-modern era

Early years
Bourne's baseball history is one of the longest of all teams on the Cape, dating as far back as the 1860s when the town was still part of Sandwich. In 1867, Sandwich had four organized baseball teams: the Nichols, Independent, Shawme, and American clubs. The "Independent Club" defeated the "Mattakeesetts" of Yarmouth that year, winning 41–35 in eight innings. The same year, the "Nichols Club" played a series of three games against the "Cummaquid Club" of Barnstable. The first game, played "a short distance from the Sandwich Glass Company's works," was won by the Cummaquids, but the Nichols Club took the second game played in Barnstable. The third game was contested at a "neutral" site in West Barnstable, with the Cummaquid Club taking the rubber match. Of these early contests, it was reported that, "a large party from this and adjoining villages were present to witness the game, and as it was new to very many of the number, it was of unusual interest."

In 1909, a team from Bourne sponsored by the Keith Car & Manufacturing Company of Sagamore played a pair of games against the Falmouth town team. In 1910, the Sagamore club was described as "one of the finest local teams on the Cape." Although the 1910 team lost twice to the powerful Hyannis town team early in the summer, the Keith squad had its revenge at the close of the season in what was billed as the baseball "championship of the Cape" at the annual Barnstable County Fair. In the four-team tournament, Falmouth defeated Hyannis and Sagamore shut out Wellfleet to set up a final game between Sagamore and Falmouth. On a rain-soaked day that produced "mud and slippery ball and bats," Sagamore prevailed in a shortened seven-inning contest, by a score reported variously as 9–3 or 10–3. The Keith team had another successful year in 1911, and again made a strong showing at the season-ending fair tournament. The Keith Car team continued to compete through at least the 1913 season, when the club was described as the "strongest team on the Cape."

The early Cape League era (1923–1939)

Bourne first joined the Cape League in 1933. The league had begun in 1923 with four teams, but over the years various towns moved in and out of the league. In 1933, Provincetown had joined the league for the first time, but withdrew mid-season. Bourne stepped in and played out the remainder of Provincetown's schedule, but won only one game in its inaugural partial season. Bourne remained in the league until the league itself folded after the 1939 season, and played its home games at the Bourne High School diamond.

In 1934 and 1935, Bourne featured hard-hitting third baseman Bob "Red" Daughters, who went on to play for the Boston Red Sox, and Freddie Moncewicz, a longtime Hyannis/Barnstable infielder who had played for Boston in 1928. Bourne's mainstay during this period was Massachusetts native Tony Plansky, who was a league all-star for Bourne each year from 1933 to 1939. Plansky, a star fullback from Georgetown University, had played professionally in the National Football League for the New York Giants and Boston Braves. Prior to the NFL, Plansky had played for Hyannis in the Cape League in 1928, and when his football career was over, Plansky returned to the Cape to play for Bourne. In 1999, Plansky was ranked by Sports Illustrated as the #25 all-time greatest sports figure from Massachusetts. He was inducted into the CCBL Hall of Fame in 2001.

Bourne had its most successful campaign of the era in 1936, winning the Cape League title led by player-manager Larry Donovan, the team's first baseman. In addition to perennial all-star Plansky, Donovan's club featured local star third baseman Ugo Tassinari, as well as several "winning pitchers" including Frank "Quack" Escott, Al Sayce, and Ray Chamberlain. Normally during this period, the Cape League season had no playoffs; a champion was determined by the best regular season record. But as it had done in 1933 and 1935, the league split the 1936 season in two half-seasons, with the winners of the two halves meeting in a postseason series for the overall title. In 1936, no postseason was needed, as Bourne took both the first and second half titles and was declared league champion.

The Upper and Lower Cape League era (1946–1962)

The Cape League was revived after World War II, and the new league began play in 1946 with 11 teams playing in Upper Cape and Lower Cape divisions. The town of Bourne was represented in the Upper Cape Division by Bourne and Sagamore teams. Bourne's team became known as the Bourne Canalmen, and Sagamore's as the Sagamore Canal Clouters, or Sagamore Clouters.

The Canalmen played in the league until 1950, then after a decade-long hiatus, returned to the league in 1961. The Bourne team of the 1940s featured CCBL Hall of Famer Jack Sanford, a hard-throwing lefty who went on to play with Sagamore until 1954, winning a career total of 60 games in the league, including a no-hitter in 1953.

The Clouters played at Keith Field, just steps from the Cape Cod Canal in the shadow of the Sagamore Bridge. Keith Field had been dedicated in 1936 and named in memory of Bourne native Eben Keith, a Massachusetts state senator and head of Keith Car & Manufacturing Company, once the Cape's largest industrial plant. The field was constructed privately by the Marconi Social and Athletic Club on land previously occupied by the Keith plant.

The Clouters were initially led by CCBL Hall of Fame manager Pat Sorenti, who later served as president and commissioner of the Cape League. CCBL Hall of Famer George Karras was Sagamore's player-manager from 1948 to 1954. Karras' teams starred CCBL Hall of Famer Tello Tontini, the team's popular infielder, who was a seven-time all-star for Sagamore from 1946 to 1952. Karras was followed by fellow CCBL Hall of Famer Manny Pena, who had played in the league for Falmouth and Sagamore from 1946 to 1955, and skippered the Clouters from 1956 to 1961.

Sagamore was a league powerhouse throughout the decade of the 1950s. To fans, it seemed that Sagamore would reach the league championship series every season, usually to face the Lower Cape's dominant team, Orleans. The Clouters claimed league titles in 1951, 1954, 1956 and 1959. At a time when most Cape League teams generally abided by the unwritten rule of using predominantly local players, Sagamore led the way in recruiting collegiate talent, and so set the stage for the league's modern era.

The Clouters first reached the title series in 1950, when they were downed by Orleans, but Sagamore had its revenge in the 1951 title rematch. In the most drawn-out championship series in league history, the best-of-five 1951 CCBL championship series was scheduled with just one game each week, and so began in late August and ended on the final day of September. The Clouters were on the verge of being swept after dropping Game 1 at home, 4–2, and Game 2 at Eldredge Park, 2–1. A classic Game 3 saw Sagamore turn the series around on a last-minute rally. Orleans had scored early in Game 3 at Keith Field, and Sagamore manager Karras brought in CCBL Hall of Fame hurler Jack Sanford, just back in his first game after a tour in Korea with the US Army, for long relief in the second inning. Sanford kept the game close, but the Clouters found themselves trailing, 5–4, in the bottom of the ninth. Needing only one final out to secure the series, Orleans committed a throwing error that scored Walt Stahura from third base. With the bases loaded and the score now tied, pinch-hitter Bill McCabe drew a walk that sent CCBL Hall of Famer Tello Tontini across the plate with the winning run. The Clouters started Sanford on the mound in Game 4 on the road, and came away with a 10–8 win highlighted by a six-run fourth inning that was manufactured on just two hits. Sanford got the call again in the Game 5 finale at neutral Lowell Park, and twirled a six-hit complete game 8–4 victory to give the championship to Sagamore. Sanford's impressive final line for the series included three wins on the mound, and a 5-for-12 performance at the plate.

Orleans topped Sagamore in the 1952 and 1953 championship series, but Sagamore rebounded again as the two clubs met in the title tilt for the fifth consecutive season in 1954. Games 1 and 2 of the 1954 championship were played as a doubleheader. In a matchup of CCBL Hall of Fame hurlers, Orleans took Game 1, 4–3, with Roy Bruninghaus outdueling the Clouters' Jack Sanford. Sagamore answered in Game 2 with a 5–3 victory behind moundsman Dick Smith. The Clouters took Game 3, but Orleans knotted the series with a 10–6 Game 4 victory, setting up a decisive Game 5 to be played on the neutral Chatham field. In the finale, the Clouters held down Orleans early, leading 5–0 after seven behind a masterful performance by Sanford. Orleans rallied to score three in the eighth, and with two down in the ninth, pushed across another and put the tying run on second. With the series on the line, Sanford put Orleans batter Johnny Linnell in the hole with two quick strikes. Linnell managed to foul off the next five offerings before Sanford finally whiffed him on a high ball to claim the crown for the Clouters.

From 1955 to 1958, the Clouters featured Billy Cleary, the 1958 Upper Cape MVP, and his brother Bobby Cleary. The Clearys were Harvard ice hockey standouts who went on to lead the US ice hockey team to a gold medal at the 1960 Winter Olympics. The Clouters were back in championship form in 1956 as Pena's men faced Cotuit for the 1956 Upper Cape title, and swept the Kettleers in two games. Sagamore jumped out early in Game 1 at Lowell Park with a six-run second frame, and hurler Johnny Karras made it stand up, tossing a complete game in the 7–5 win. The Clouters pasted Cotuit at Keith Field in Game 2, striking in the second once again with an eight-run frame, and riding the strong arm of Dick Smith to the 13–2 victory. The win sent Sagamore to the Cape League title series against the Lower Cape champion Dennis Clippers. Smith twirled a two-hitter in Game 1 of the title tilt, and the Clouters downed the Clippers at Dennis, 7–1. Game 2 was a tight pitcher's duel early, but Sagamore scratched out a 5–3 win to secure its third Cape League championship in six years.

Sagamore's 1958 and 1959 teams featured Bill Powers, who earned the Upper Cape Division's Most Valuable Pitcher Award in both seasons. Pena's Clouters reached the championship series again in 1958, but were downed by Yarmouth, then bounced back in 1959 to claim another CCBL championship. Sagamore finished atop the Upper Cape league in both halves of the 1959 regular season, earning a spot in the title series against their familiar foe, Lower Cape champ Orleans. The Clouters jumped ahead in the best-of-three 1959 championship series as Powers went the distance on the mound in the 14–4 Game 1 rout at Keith Field. Sagamore completed the sweep in Game 2 at Eldredge Park, scratching out a 5–3 win to give the Clouters the title. The 1959 series was the Clouters' final championship matchup with longtime foe Orleans, and Sagamore's win evened the score at three titles apiece over the teams' six title tilts in the decade.

In a repeat of its 1958 title loss, Sagamore was again downed in the 1960 championship series by Lower Cape champion Yarmouth. The 1962 Clouters featured CCBL Hall of Famer Wayne Granger, who hit .329 with six homers.

Modern era (1963–present)

The 1960s and 1970s

In 1963, the CCBL was reorganized and became officially sanctioned by the NCAA. The league would no longer be characterized by "town teams" who fielded mainly Cape Cod residents, but would now be a formal collegiate league. Teams began to recruit college players and coaches from an increasingly wide geographic radius.

The league was originally composed of ten teams, which were divided into Upper Cape and Lower Cape divisions. The Clouters and Canalmen joined Wareham, Falmouth, and Cotuit in the Upper Cape Division.

Bourne reached the playoffs in 1963, but was bumped out in the first round by Wareham. In 1964, CCBL Hall of Famer Lou Lamoriello became Bourne's 21-year-old player-manager. Lamoriello had played in the Cape League since 1961 with Harwich and Orleans. His 1964 Bourne club starred CCBL Hall of Famer and league batting champion Harry Nelson, who hit .390 for the season.

Sagamore's 1963 team featured future major league all-star Billy Grabarkewitz, but the team finished in last place with only six wins on the season.

The two teams from Bourne merged for the 1965 season as the Sagamore Canalmen. The 1965 team was skippered by Lou Lamoriello, now no longer in a player-manager role. Powered by an array of talented ballplayers, including league MVP Ron Bugbee, and CCBL Hall of Famers Dan DeMichele, shortstop Bob Schaefer, and pitcher Noel Kinski, who won 10 games for the team. The 1965 club went 25–9 in the regular season and met Lower Cape champ Chatham in the best-of-five CCBL title series. Kinski got the 4–3 win for Sagamore in Game 1 at Veteran's Field, but the Canalmen lost a 16–14 slugfest as the teams combined for nine home runs at cozy Keith Field in Game 2. Kinski was on the mound again on the road for Game 3, and tossed a complete game three-hit gem in the 2–1 Sagamore victory. Chatham again knotted the series with a Game 4 win, setting up the Game 5 finale back in Chatham. Making his first start of the season on the mound, the Canalmen's Bob Ritchie overcame Chatham's four-run first inning to scatter nine hits in a complete game 5–4 win that gave Sagamore the league championship.

In 1967, the club reclaimed its former moniker Bourne Canalmen, and the late 1960s saw two more CCBL Hall of Fame players on the team. Former Bourne High School baseball star Jim Prete played several seasons in the CCBL with Bourne and Wareham. Notre Dame slugger Dick Licini was league MVP in 1968, leading the league with a .382 batting average.

Bourne withdrew from the league for the 1970 season, but was back the following season. 1971 and 1972 saw the return of 1965 Sagamore shortstop Bob Schaefer, now the pilot of the Bourne team. Schaefer's 1972 team featured CCBL Hall of Fame pitcher John Caneira, who racked up 119 strikeouts as the league's Outstanding Pitcher. The team folded after the 1972 season, beginning a 16-year period when Bourne did not field a team in the league.

The 1980s: the Braves are born

In 1988, the Cape League expanded from eight teams to ten, adding the Brewster Whitecaps and Bourne Braves, and forming two new five-team divisions. The drive to secure a team for Bourne was led by CCBL Hall of Famers Jack Aylmer, president of Bourne's Massachusetts Maritime Academy and a former state senator, and Maritime head baseball coach Bob Corradi. Aylmer had spearheaded the Cape League's addition of an expansion franchise in Hyannis in 1976, and their positions at the Maritime Academy afforded Aylmer and Corradi a similar opportunity in 1988. The Bourne Braves called the Academy's Hendy Field home from 1988 to 1995, when they moved to Coady School Field next to Bourne High School.

In their inaugural 1988 season, the Braves were skippered by Maritime Academy assistant coach Jim Watkins. Worcester, Massachusetts native and Dartmouth College product Mark Johnson played for the Braves in 1988 and 1989, and went on to play several seasons in the big leagues. In 1989, just the Braves' second year in the league, Watkins' squad finished the regular season in first place atop the West Division, but was bumped from the playoffs in the West finals by Hyannis. The 1989 Braves starred infielder Bob Rivell, the league's 10th Player Award winner, who led the league with a .358 batting average, and also featured Cape Cod native Jeff Handler of Harwich, the team's starting third baseman from Eastern Connecticut State University.

The 1990s

Bourne struggled throughout the 1990s, and fan support was low at times. The team made the playoffs only twice, being ousted by Wareham in the West Division finals in both 1997 and 1998. Notable players of the decade included local product Steve Corradi of Sandwich and UMass-Amherst, who was a league all-star for the Braves in 1990, and returned to the Braves in 1991 and 1992. The 1991 Braves featured two future CCBL Hall of Famers: Framingham, Massachusetts native Lou Merloni, and tall righty Bill Wissler, who returned from the 1990 team and was named the league's Outstanding Pitcher in both seasons. Wissler had posted an 8–2 record with a 1.56 ERA in 1990. In 1991, he led the league in innings pitched with 92, and posted a 1.96 ERA with seven complete games and three shutouts. The 1991 squad also featured slugger Bobby Higginson, who went on to an 11-year career with the Detroit Tigers. Bill Mueller was a Cape League all-star with the 1992 Braves, then went on to win an American League batting title, and was starting third baseman for the World Series champion 2004 Boston Red Sox. 1992 Braves hurler Ron Villone left the team mid-season to play for Team USA at the 1992 Summer Olympics in Barcelona, and 1994 Brave Mark Kotsay won a bronze medal with Team USA at the 1996 Atlanta Olympics before going on to a 17-year major league career. Future major league all-stars Brandon Inge and hurler Mark Mulder were CCBL all-stars for the Braves in 1997.

The 2000s and the Braves' first championship

Bourne's 2001 team featured CCBL Hall of Fame reliever Ryan Speier, winner of the league's Outstanding Relief Pitcher Award. Speier set a league record with 16 saves, and allowed only 10 hits, one walk, and one earned run in his 20 innings of relief. The team made the playoffs, but was once again ousted by Wareham.

2003 saw the arrival of CCBL Hall of Fame manager Harvey Shapiro. In his first year with the team, Shapiro led the Braves to their first appearance in the league's championship series, where they were defeated by Orleans. The Braves were led by the microscopic earned run averages of Kyle Schmidt (0.55) and CCBL Hall of Famer Eric Beattie (0.39). Beattie went 4–0 and struck out 51 while walking only six on the season, and was named the league's Outstanding Pitcher. The team again reached the championship series in 2005, but was again shut down by Orleans.

In 2006, the Braves moved from Coady Field to a new field constructed behind Upper Cape Cod Regional Technical School. The following season, the field was dedicated as "Doran Park" in honor of George Doran, Sr. The 2006 team was powered by future Boston Red Sox slugger Mitch Moreland, who won the league's annual All-Star Game Home Run Derby.

In 2009, the Braves finished in first place in the West Division, and featured the league's MVP in CCBL Hall of Famer Kyle Roller, who hit .342 with 33 RBIs and a league-best 10 home runs during the regular season, and Pierre LePage, the spark plug of Shapiro's club, who was the league's 10th Player Award winner. In a year when playoff seedings crossed divisional lines, Bourne faced old nemesis Orleans for the right to advance to the championship series.

Game 1 of the semi-final series did not look good for Bourne, as Orleans hurler Jorge Reyes dominated the Braves through eight innings at Doran Park, and took a 2–0 lead into the final frame. But with one out in the ninth, Bourne's Scott Woodward singled, and LePage drew a four-pitch walk that marked the end of Reyes' night. Roller then lined a shot off the shortstop's glove into left field that allowed Woodward to score on a close play at home. LePage scored the game-tying run on a wild pitch, and Stefan Romero belted a long sacrifice fly that brought in Roller from third with the walk-off score. Game 2 at Eldredge Park was not as dramatic. Braves starter Seth Maness set down 10 straight Firebirds to open the game, and Bourne got solo shots from LePage and Roller, going on to shut out Orleans, 8–0, and sweeping its way into the CCBL title series against Cotuit.

The championship series opened at Doran Park, with the Braves starting Alex Wimmers on the mound for Game 1. The Braves proceeded to jump all over the Kettleers, scoring seven in the first, and another six in the second, on a total of eight hits and eight walks in the first two frames. Cotuit managed only one run through five innings, but had begun to make noise in the sixth when the game was interrupted multiple times and finally called due to heavy fog, a 15–5 Braves victory. In Game 2 at Lowell Park, LePage again was the spark, belting a two-run single in the third, then stealing second and drawing a throw that allowed Woodward to score from third to put the Braves up, 3–1. Bourne never looked back. Starter Eric Cantrell tossed five plus, then gave way to Logan Billbrough and closer Kevin Munson, who shut down the Kettleers' attack. Bourne took it, 5–1, to complete the sweep and earn the Braves' first CCBL title, and the first for a Bourne team since the 1965 Sagamore club. Roller took home playoff MVP honors, having hit .500 with eight RBIs in the postseason.

The 2010s

The Braves reached the playoffs in nine of ten years in the 2010s, advancing to the West Division finals five times. Bourne was back in the title series in 2017, but was downed by Brewster in a matchup of the two 1988 expansion franchises. Skipper Harvey Shapiro continued to pilot the team throughout the decade, his total years with the Braves surpassing the total of all previous managers combined.

In 2010, Bourne featured the league's Outstanding Pro Prospect and Outstanding Relief Pitcher, Tony Zych. Zych allowed only two runs while striking out 29 in 20.1 innings, posting an 0.89 ERA with 12 saves, and contributing a shutout inning in the CCBL All-Star Game. Joining Zych on the 2010 staff was the league's Outstanding Pitcher, Grayson Garvin, who went 5–0 with a league-leading 0.74 ERA in 36.2 innings. The Outstanding Pitcher Award went to a Brave for a second consecutive season when Ryan Eades took the 2011 honor. Eades posted a 3–0 record with an 0.84 ERA in 32.1 innings, and was the West Division starting pitcher at the CCBL All-Star Game.

Bourne boasted the league MVP twice in the decade, as Travis Jankowski took home the honor in 2011, and Max Pentecost won it in 2013. Jankowski hit .329 and stole 15 bases, and led the league in hits, runs and triples. Pentecost was among the league leaders in all three triple crown categories, finishing with a .346 average, 6 homers and 29 RBIs. Braves hurler Jeff Thompson spun a no-hitter in a rain-shortened six-inning game against Harwich at Doran Park in 2012, and pitchers Austin Gomber, Josh Laxer, and Ryan Harris teamed up for a combined no-hitter at Cotuit in 2013.

Bourne's Spencer Brickhouse was West Division MVP at the 2018 CCBL All-Star Game, going 2-for-2 with a homer, double and two RBI's in the West's 4–3 victory. A pair of Braves hurlers were named co-recipients of the league's Outstanding New England Player Award in 2018, as Justin Lasko of Stratford, Connecticut and the University of Massachusetts shared the honor with Methuen, Massachusetts native Jacob Wallace of the University of Connecticut. University of Hartford lefty Nick Dombkowski provided the highlight of the 2019 season when he tossed a perfect game for Bourne in a 5-inning rain-shortened 6–0 win over Yarmouth-Dennis at Doran Park.

The 2020s: Braves claim their second championship
The 2020 CCBL season was cancelled due to the coronavirus pandemic. Shapiro's 2021 Braves began the season with an 11-game winning streak, followed it up with another 8-game streak later in the season, and finished the regular season in first place atop the West Division, but were downed in the playoff finals by Brewster. After the 2021 season, Shapiro stepped down as Bourne's manager after 18 seasons.

The 2022 Braves were led by first-year pilot Scott Landers and hitting coach and former Boston Red Sox catcher Jarrod Saltalamacchia. Bourne featured league MVP Matt Shaw, who led the league in batting (.360), and became the first CCBL player in 11 years to hit for the cycle when he accomplished the feat at Hyannis. The Braves finished the regular season in first place atop the West Division, and after disposing of Falmouth and Hyannis in the divisional playoffs, met the Brewster Whitecaps in the CCBL championship series for a second consecutive season. Braves skipper Scott Landers, who had been the pitching coach for Brewster during their 2021 finals victory over Bourne, was now poised to help his new club exact its revenge. In Game 1 at Doran Park, the Braves rode a shutout performance by hurlers Matt Duffy and Seth Keener, and scratched out three runs against strong Brewster pitching to take the opener. On the road for Game 2, Bourne jumped out to an early lead with a four-run first inning and never looked back. Shaw and Ryan Enos added late-game homers to give the Braves a series-clinching 8–1 win to secure the club's second CCBL crown of the modern era. Playoff MVP Bryce Eblin batted .458 in the postseason, and went 4-for-5 in the Game 2 finale.

CCBL Hall of Fame inductees

The CCBL Hall of Fame and Museum is a history museum and hall of fame honoring past players, coaches, and others who have made outstanding contributions to the CCBL. Below are the inductees who spent all or part of their time in the Cape League with Bourne.

Notable alumni

Nick Ahmed 2010
Keegan Akin 2015
Pete Alonso 2015
R.J. Alvarez 2010–2011
Brian Anderson 2001
Harrison Bader 2014
Bryan Baker 2015
Brandon Bantz 2008
Mike Bell 1993
Travis Bergen 2014
Vic Black 2008
Joe Blanton 2001
Brennan Boesch 2005
Ryan Boldt 2015
Justin Bour 2008
Alec Burleson 2019
Daniel Cabrera 2018
John Caneira 1972
Chris Capuano 1999
Andrew Carignan 2005–2006
Tim Cate 2017
C. J. Chatham 2015
Billy Cleary 1956–1958
Bobby Cleary 1956–1958
Jason Coats 2010
Dusty Coleman 2008
Dylan Coleman 2017
Reggie Crawford 2021
Michael Crotta 2005
Ryan Cusick 2019
Bob "Red" Daughters 1934–1935
Henry Davis 2019
Greg Deichmann 2016
David DeJesus 1998
Jason Delay 2015
Mark DeRosa 1995
John Dockery 1965
Ryan Eades 2011
Jeremy Eierman 2016–2017
Jud Fabian 2019
Kyle Farmer 2011
Ryan Feltner 2017
Joe Ferris 1964
Paco Figueroa 2004
Foxy Flumere 1939
Eddie Gaillard 1991
Herb Gallagher 1939
Grayson Garvin 2010
Jeremy Giambi 1994
Austin Gomber 2013
Billy Grabarkewitz 1963
Wayne Granger 1962
Chad Green 2011–2012
Justin Grimm 2008
Ben Guez 2007
Jerry Hairston Jr. 1996
Mitch Harris 2007
Thomas Hatch 2014
Jimmy Herget 2014
Bobby Higginson 1991
Bryan Hoeing 2017–2018
J.P. Howell 2002
Jed Hoyer 1995
Tim Hummel 1998
Brandon Inge 1997
Joe Inglett 1999
Conor Jackson 2001
Travis Jankowski 2010–2011
Mark P. Johnson 1988–1989
Tommy Kahnle 2010
Ryan Kellogg 2013
Grae Kessinger 2018
Mark Kotsay 1994
Marc Krauss 2008
Tommy La Stella 2010
Lou Lamoriello 1964
Brad Lincoln 2005
Jacob Lindgren 2013
Brendon Little 2016
Jaron Long 2012
Vimael Machín 2014
David MacKinnon 2016
Seth Maness 2009
Jake Mangum 2017
Richie Martin 2014
Justin Maxwell 2003
Mike Mayers 2012
L. J. Mazzilli 2012
John McDonald 1995
Brendan McKay 2015
Mark McLemore 2001
Lou Merloni 1991
D. J. Mitchell 2007
Gabe Molina 1994
Freddie Moncewicz 1934–1935
Colin Moran 2011–2012
Mitch Moreland 2006–2007
Robert Morey 2009
Mike Morin 2010
Cody Morissette 2019
Bill Mueller 1992
Mark Mulder 1997
Kevin Munson 2009
Scott Oberg 2009
Peter O'Brien 2010
R. C. Orlan 2010
Micah Owings 2004
Richie Palacios 2017
Robb Paller 2015
Blake Parker 2005
Jordan Patterson 2012
Max Pentecost 2013
Tony Plansky 1933–1939
Justin Pope 2000
Hugh Quattlebaum 1999
Luke Raley 2014
Chris Ray 2002
Dan Reichert 1995–1996
Jack Reinheimer 2012
Greg Reynolds 2004–2005
Jacob Robson 2015
Josh Rogers 2014–2015
Kyle Roller 2008–2009
Stefen Romero 2009
Dalton Rushing 2021
Josh Satin 2007
Warren Sawkiw 1988–1989
Bob Schaefer 1965
Cody Sedlock 2015
Rob Segedin 2009
Brian Serven 2014
Travis Shaw 2010
Joe Simokaitis 2004
Eric Skoglund 2013
Greg Smith 2004
Tommy Smith 1969
Nick Solak 2015
Andrew Sopko 2014
Ryan Speier 2001
Ryne Stanek 2011
Mickey Storey 2006–2007
Joe Thatcher 2003
Jared Theodorakos 2002
Matt Tolbert 2003–2004
Devon Travis 2010
Robert Tyler 2015
Ron Villone 1992
Cayden Wallace 2021
Andrew Wantz 2016
Robbie Widlansky 2005
Alika Williams 2018–2019
Gavin Williams 2018
Alex Wimmers 2009
Connor Wong 2016
Austin Wynns 2012
Kevin Youkilis 2000
Tony Zych 2010

Yearly results

Results by season, 1933–1939

* During the CCBL's 1923–1939 era, postseason playoffs were a rarity. In most years, the regular season pennant winner was simply crowned as the league champion.However, there were four years in which the league split its regular season and crowned separate champions for the first (A) and second (B) halves. In two of thoseseasons (1936 and 1939), a single team won both halves and was declared overall champion. In the other two split seasons (1933 and 1935), a postseasonplayoff series was contested between the two half-season champions to determine the overall champion.† In 1933, Bourne joined the league mid-season after Provincetown withdrew.

Results by season, 1946–1962

* Regular seasons split into first and second halves are designated as (A) and (B).

Results by season, 1963–1972

Results by season, 1988–present

League award winners

(*) - Indicates co-recipient

All-Star Game selections

Italics - Indicates All-Star Game Home Run Hitting Contest participant

No-hit games

Managerial history

(*) - Season count excludes 2020 CCBL season cancelled due to coronavirus pandemic.

See also
 Bourne Braves players

References

External links

Rosters

 2000
 2001
 2002
 2003
 2004
 2005
 2006
 2007
 2008
 2009
 2010
 2011
 2012
 2013
 2014
 2015
 2016
 2017
 2018
 2019
 2021
 2022

Other links
Bourne Braves official site
CCBL Home Page

Cape Cod Baseball League teams
Amateur baseball teams in Massachusetts
Bourne, Massachusetts